Firecracker is an album by Lisa Loeb. It was released in 1997 through Geffen Records.

The album was certified Gold in the U.S. and Canada and was nominated for the 1999 Grammy Award for Best Engineered Album, Non-Classical.

The first single from the album, "I Do" hit #17 on the U.S. Billboard Charts, her third Top 20 single after "Stay (I Missed You)" and "Do You Sleep?". The single also hit #1 in Canada.

The follow-up single, "Let's Forget About It" hit #71 in the U.S. and #21 in Canada. "Truthfully" was also issued as a single in Japan.

The song, "How", was used in the feature films, Twister and Jack Frost.

Track listing

Charts

Weekly charts

References

External links
 
 

1997 albums
Geffen Records albums
Lisa Loeb albums